Siglerville is a census-designated place located in central Armagh Township, Mifflin County in the state of Pennsylvania, United States.  It is located just to the southwest of Bald Eagle State Forest.  As of the 2010 census, the population was 106 residents.

References

Census-designated places in Mifflin County, Pennsylvania
Census-designated places in Pennsylvania